August Laur (9 October 1886 Vana-Põltsamaa Parish (now Põltsamaa Parish), Kreis Fellin – 8 September 1942 Sosva camp, Sverdlovsk Oblast) was an Estonian politician. He was a member of III, IV and V Riigikogu.

Laur was arrested in 1941 by the NKVD following the Soviet occupation of Estonia. He was executed by gunshot in prison custody in Sverdlovsk Oblast.

References

1886 births
1942 deaths
People from Põltsamaa Parish
People from Kreis Fellin
Settlers' Party politicians
Patriotic League (Estonia) politicians
Members of the Riigikogu, 1926–1929
Members of the Riigikogu, 1929–1932
Members of the Riigikogu, 1932–1934
Members of the Estonian National Assembly
Members of the Riigivolikogu
Estonian people executed by the Soviet Union
People who died in the Gulag